Hisashi Igawa (井川比佐志 born 17 November 1936) is a Japanese actor who has appeared in such films as Akira Kurosawa's Dodesukaden, Ran and Madadayo. He starred in Abe Kōbō's production of The Man Who Turned Into A Stick, a surrealist play, in 1969.

Selected filmography

Film

Television

Honours
Medal with Purple Ribbon (2002)
Order of the Rising Sun, 4th Class, Gold Rays with Rosette (2008)

References

External links

1936 births
Living people
Japanese male film actors
Recipients of the Medal with Purple Ribbon
Recipients of the Order of the Rising Sun, 4th class